Top 100 México is a record chart which accounts for sixty percent of the albums sold in Mexico. The chart has the support of major record distributors in Mexico and is issued by the Mexican Association of Producers of Phonograms and Videograms, A.C.(Asociación Mexicana de Productores de Fonogramas y Videogramas) since 2005 on a weekly basis. The Top 100 México contains over 100 titles sold in the country, with separate charts that include 20 albums for popular music genres, such as norteño, banda and ranchera, Spanish, and English language albums.

In 2005, the best-selling album in Mexico was the soundtrack for the TV series Rebelde, recorded by the lead cast members, who eventually formed the band RBD; in the United States the album sold 416,000 copies and was named the Pop Album of the Year at the Billboard Latin Music Awards. La Voz de un Ángel by Yuridia was the number-one selling album of 2006 (also ranked at number 5 in 2005 and 52 in 2007), and the album eventually received a diamond certification in the country, the first since 1996 when performer Luis Miguel achieved that feat. Papito by Spanish performer Miguel Bosé was the best-selling album of 2007, received the Oye! Award for Album of the Year and earned four Latin Grammy Award nominations.

Para Siempre, the 79th studio album released by Vicente Fernández was the number-one album of 2008 in Mexico and the best-selling Regional-Mexican album of the decade 2000-2009 in the United States. Mexican band Camila earned a gold certificacion in Mexico the day of the release of their second studio album Dejarte de Amar, which ended 2010 as the best-selling recording in the country. Since May 2013, some positions of the chart are published in the official Twitter account of AMPROFON including the number one position. As of July 9, 2020, the chart was discontinued.

Number-one albums by year

Best-selling albums by year

See also 
List of best-selling albums in Mexico

References

Mexican record charts